"Flesh and Bone" is the eighth episode of the reimagined Battlestar Galactica television series.

Plot

In the fleet
President Roslin has a dream where she is in a forest with a copy of the Cylon Leoben Conoy. As the dream ends, Leoben is suddenly sucked away from her. Upon waking, Roslin is informed by Billy Keikeya that the captain of the Gemenon Traveler has found a Cylon on his ship. The Cylon is a copy of Leoben who was identified by the pictures recently shared with the fleet. Despite Commander Adama urging Roslin to kill Leoben, she chooses to have Leoben interrogated. Adama chooses to assign Starbuck to the interrogation, believing that she won't be drawn in by Leoben's manipulations.

Boomer continues her strange behavior, now humming a lullaby to the Cylon Raider that Starbuck captured. Having followed Boomer's advice to treat the Raider as an animal rather than a machine, Chief Tyrol and Starbuck have had some luck in deciphering many of its basic controls, but Tyrol is now suspicious that Boomer is a Cylon and remains distant from her. Having heard of Baltar's Cylon detector, Boomer visits him to get tested. After Boomer reminds Baltar that she saved his life on Caprica and that Helo gave up his seat for Baltar, he agrees to use Boomer as a Beta test, learning in the process that Boomer's entire family is dead in a mining accident that destroyed her whole colony. Baltar's Cylon detector reveals that Boomer is indeed a Cylon, but Baltar's internal Six warns him that Boomer is likely unaware of her true nature and her Cylon side will kill him to keep the secret. As a result, Baltar lies to Boomer that she's a human.

On the Gemenon Traveler, Starbuck interrogates Leoben who recognizes Starbuck by callsign even though Starbuck refuses to tell him her name. Leoben claims he has hidden a nuclear weapon on one of the ships in the fleet that will go off at 18:30 hours. Starbuck is forced to continue interrogating Leoben while the fleet searches for the bomb without success. As Starbuck employs multiple methods of torture, particularly waterboarding, Leoben claims to be able to see the future and speaks of his religious beliefs with Starbuck who believes that he is simply afraid that he is too far away from the Cylon homeworld to download when he dies and is lying as a result. Leoben shows a knowledge of Starbuck's past and an understanding of her character before revealing that the fleet will find Kobol and from there, Earth.

After another disturbing dream featuring Leoben and with less than an hour left until the bomb goes off, Roslin decides to visit Leoben herself. Roslin stops Starbuck's torture of him and extends a hand of peace to Leoben who admits that there is no nuclear bomb. Leoben claims that Starbuck is right: he is just afraid that he is too far away to download when he dies and he made up a lie as a result. However, Leoben whispers in Roslin's ear that "Adama is a Cylon." Disturbed, Roslin immediately orders Leoben blown out the airlock. As Leoben is airlocked, a shocked Roslin recognizes that the event matches the end of her dream.

After Leoben's death, Starbuck prays to the Lords of Kobol to take care of Leoben's soul despite her previous belief that he had none as she knows Leoben feared his soul would not reach God. Roslin meets with Adama over the events and has become secretly suspicious towards Adama due to Leoben's words to her.

On Caprica
The morning after having sex with Helo, Sharon meets with copies of Aaron Doral and Number Six in an abandoned playground. Sharon reveals that she has had sex with Helo and that while she believes that Helo loves her, he hasn't explicitly stated it. The two Cylons reveal that they are building a cabin nearby and Sharon is to convince Helo to build a life with her there or to kill him which Sharon promises to do.

However, after leaving the other Cylons, Sharon reflects on her life with Helo. After reaching Helo, Sharon tells him that they must run again and faster than they had before. When questioned as to why, all Sharon will tell him is that everything has changed.

Reception
IGN stated this episode had one of the best scenes in the series.

The Digital Fix called it a very strong episode.

Den of Geek called it "an uncomfortable episode".

The A.V. Club calls it the worse episode of the season.

References

External links
 "Flesh and Bone" at the Battlestar Wiki
 "Flesh and Bone" at Syfy
 

2004 American television episodes
Battlestar Galactica (season 1) episodes

fr:Saison 1 de Battlestar Galactica#De chair et de sang